The 2019 Louisiana Ragin' Cajuns softball team represented the University of Louisiana at Lafayette in the 2019 NCAA Division I softball season. The Ragin' Cajuns played their home games at Yvette Girouard Field at Lamson Park and were led by second-year head coach Gerry Glasco.

The Cajuns defeated Southeast Missouri State and Ole Miss early in the Oxford Regionals. They went on to the Championship Game but lost to Ole Miss 1-5, forcing the game 7. In game 7, the Cajuns rallied back from 0-3 by a three-run homerun by Raina O'Neal. They took the lead at 4-3 before losing to Ole Miss after the Rebels scored two runs late in the 7th inning.

Preseason

Sun Belt Conference Coaches Poll
The Sun Belt Conference Coaches Poll was released on February 1, 2019. Louisiana was picked to finish first in the Sun Belt Conference with 98 votes and 8 first place votes.

Preseason All-Sun Belt team
Summer Ellyson (LA, JR, Pitcher)
Annie Willis (TROY, SO, Pitcher)
Lexie Comeaux (LA, SR, Catcher)
Reagan Wright (UTA, JR, Catcher)
Haleigh Davis (TXST, JR, Catcher)
Hailey MacKay (TXST, JR, 1st Base)
Katie Webb (TROY, JR, 1st Base)
Kristin Hawkins (GSU, SR, 2nd Base)
Kara Gremillion (LA, SR, 3rd Base)
Alissa Dalton (LA, JR, Shortstop)
Jayden Mount (ULM, JR, Shortstop)
Courtney Dean (CCU, SO, Outfield)
Sydney McKay (ULM, SR, Outfield)
Laura Curry (UTA, SR, Outfield)
Jenny Dodd (APST, SR, Designated Player)

Sun Belt Conference Preseason Player of the Year
Alissa Dalton (LA, JR, Shortstop)

Sun Belt Conference Preseason Pitcher of the Year
Summer Ellyson (LA, JR, Pitcher)

Roster

Coaching staff

Schedule and results

{| class="toccolours" width=95% style="clear:both; margin:1.5em auto; text-align:center;"
|-
! colspan=2 style="" | 2019 Louisiana Ragin' Cajuns Softball Game Log
|-
! colspan=2 style="" | Regular Season (47-4)
|- valign="top"
|

|-
|

|-
|

|-
|

|-
! colspan=2 style="" | Post-Season (5-2)
|-
|

|-
|
{| class="wikitable collapsible " style="margin:auto; width:100%; text-align:center; font-size:95%"
! colspan=12 style="padding-left:4em;" | NCAA Division I softball tournament (2-2)
|-
! Date
! Opponent
! (Seed)/Rank
! Site/Stadium
! Score
! Win
! Loss
! Save
! TV
! Attendance
! Overall Record
! SBC Record
|-
!colspan=12| Oxford Regionals
|- align="center" bgcolor=#ddffdd
|May 17 || vs. (3) Southeast Missouri State || (2)/No. 7 || Ole Miss Softball Complex • Oxford, MS || W 3-2 || Ellyson (38-4) || Thogmartin (22-7) || None || ESPN3 || 1,490 || 51–4 ||
|- align="center" bgcolor=#ddffdd
|May 18 || vs. (1) No. 17 Ole Miss || (2)/No. 7 || Ole Miss Softball Complex • Oxford, MS || W 2-0 || Ellyson (39-4) || Jacobsen (13-7) || None || ESPN3 || 1,683 || 52-4 ||
|- align="center" bgcolor=#ffdddd
|May 19 || vs. (1) No. 17 Ole Miss || (2)/No. 7 || Ole Miss Softball Complex • Oxford, MS || L 1-5 || Jacobsen (14-7) || Ellyson (39-5) || None || ESPN3 || || 52-5 ||
|- align="center" bgcolor=#ffdddd
|May 19 || vs. (1) No. 17 Ole Miss || (2)/No. 7 || Ole Miss Softball Complex • Oxford, MS || L 4-5 || Finney (18-9) || Ellyson (39-6) || None'' || ESPN3 || || 52-6 ||
|}
|}Schedule Source:'''
*Rankings are based on the team's current ranking in the NFCA/USA Softball poll.

Oxford Regional

References

Louisiana
Louisiana Ragin' Cajuns softball seasons
Louisiana Ragin' Cajuns softball